The Lotus 55 was an open-wheel Formula 3 racing car used as a one-off by British motorsport team Lotus in 1968.

The Lotus 55 was based on the Lotus 41X, built as a one-off in 1967. The car had an extreme wedge shape and was driven by John Miles in 1968.

Miles achieved a number of victories in the British Formula 3 Championship and in the FIA Formula 3 European Nations Cup with the agile car.

The car was painted in the iconic colors of the sponsor Gold Leaf, analogous to the Lotus Formula One cars of the time.

References 

Formula Three cars
55
Open wheel racing cars